L'Île-d'Orléans is a regional county municipality in central Quebec, Canada, in the Capitale-Nationale region. Its seat is Sainte-Famille-de-l'Île-d'Orléans. The population in the 2016 census was 7,082 people.

The RCM consists solely of the Île d'Orléans, an island in the Saint Lawrence River just east of Quebec City. It is the smallest RCM in Quebec in terms of land area (though not in total area including water).

Subdivisions
There are 6 subdivisions within the RCM:

Municipalities (5)
 Sainte-Famille-de-l'Île-d'Orléans
 Saint-François-de-l'Île-d'Orléans
 Saint-Jean-de-l'Île-d'Orléans
 Saint-Laurent-de-l'Île-d'Orléans
 Saint-Pierre-de-l'Île-d'Orléans

Villages (1)
 Sainte-Pétronille

Demographics

Population

Language

Transportation

Access Routes
Highways and numbered routes that run through the municipality, including external routes that start or finish at the county border:

 Autoroutes
 None

 Principal Highways
 None

 Secondary Highways
 

 External Routes
 None

See also
 List of regional county municipalities and equivalent territories in Quebec

References

External links

 MRC de l'Île d'Orléans official website
 Carte cadastrale - Surveyor's map, A.D. 1709